Un peu de nous (meaning A Bit of Us) is a primarily French-language compilation album by Canadian singer Celine Dion, released by Columbia Records on 21 July 2017 in France and on 28 July 2017 in Belgium Wallonia. The 3-CD set includes studio versions of songs performed by Dion during her 2017 tour on two discs, and also instrumental versions of selected tracks on the third disc. The title Un peu de nous was taken from the "Encore un soir" song lyrics. The album topped the chart in France and was certified Gold. It also reached number six in Belgium Wallonia.

Content
The album includes studio versions of songs, which Dion performed during her Celine Dion Live 2017 tour. It features French-language hits like: "Pour que tu m'aimes encore", "Je sais pas", "Encore un soir", "S'il suffisait d'aimer", "On ne change pas" and "Un garçon pas comme les autres (Ziggy)". Un peu de nous also contains few English-language hits, including "My Heart Will Go On" and "Because You Loved Me". The third disc includes instrumental versions of selected tracks.

Commercial performance
Un peu de nous debuted at number one in France with 13,056 copies sold in the first week. It stayed at the top for the second week, selling 12,420 units. Un peu de nous remained at the top in the third week, selling another 12,000 copies. In the fourth week, Un peu de nous stayed at number one on the Sales Chart, selling 7,697 units, whereas it fell to number two on the Sales/Streaming Chart. The next week, Un peu de nous has sold 4,587 copies and fell to number three on the Sales Chart and number ten on the Sales/Streaming Chart. One month after release, Un peu de nous has sold 50,000 copies in France, and was certified Gold on 25 August 2017. In the sixth week, the album fell to number eight on the Sales Chart and number seventeen on the Sales/Streaming Chart, selling another 3,511 units. The next week, Un peu de nous dropped to number nine on the Sales Chart and number twenty-one on the Sales/Streaming Chart, selling 3,084 units, and bringing the total sales to 56,355 copies. In 2017, the album has sold 80,082 copies in France. It also reached number six in Belgium Wallonia.

Track listing

Notes
 signifies an additional producer
 signifies a vocal producer
 signifies a co-producer

Charts

Weekly charts

Year-end charts

Certifications and sales

|}

Release history

See also
Celine Dion Live 2017
List of number-one hits of 2017 (France)

References

External links

2017 compilation albums
Celine Dion compilation albums
French-language compilation albums